Emathia is a genus of cicadas in the family Cicadidae. There are at least two described species in Emathia.

Species
These two species belong to the genus Emathia:
 Emathia aegrota Stal, 1866 c g
 Emathia takensis (Boulard, 2006) c g
Data sources: i = ITIS, c = Catalogue of Life, g = GBIF, b = Bugguide.net

References

Further reading

 
 
 
 

Cicadatrini
Cicadidae genera